The Labour Relations Law was a legislation in Ethiopia, passed in 1962. The law provided the first legal sanction for the establishment of trade unions in the country.

References

1962 in Ethiopia
Law of Ethiopia